The Jury Speaks is an American documentary television series airing on Oxygen. The show reexamines some of the most high-profile and controversial cases in history through the eyes of the people who served on the original jury.

Episodes

References

2010s American documentary television series
2017 American television series debuts
English-language television shows
Documentary films about law in the United States
Juries in the United States